Xin County or Xinxian is a county in the southeast of Henan province, China, bordering Hubei province to the south. It is under the administration of the prefecture-level city of Xinyang.

Administrative divisions
As 2012, this county is divided to 5 towns and 10 townships.
Towns

Townships

Climate

References

County-level divisions of Henan
Xinyang